The 1979–80 Bundesliga was the 17th season of the Bundesliga, West Germany's premier football league. It began on 11 August 1979 and ended on 31 May 1980. Hamburger SV were the defending champions.

Competition modus
Every team played two games against each other team, one at home and one away. Teams received two points for a win and one point for a draw. If two or more teams were tied on points, places were determined by goal difference and, if still tied, by goals scored. The team with the most points were crowned champions while the three teams with the fewest points were relegated to their respective 2. Bundesliga divisions.

Team changes to 1978–79
Arminia Bielefeld, 1. FC Nürnberg and SV Darmstadt 98 were relegated to the 2. Bundesliga after finishing in the last three places. They were replaced by Bayer Leverkusen, winners of the 2. Bundesliga Northern Division, TSV 1860 Munich, winners of the Southern Division and Bayer Uerdingen, who won a two-legged promotion play-off against SpVgg Bayreuth.

Season overview

Team overview

 1860 Munich played their first matches in Olympiastadion until renovation at their primary venue had been completed.

League table

Results

Top goalscorers
26 goals
  Karl-Heinz Rummenigge (FC Bayern Munich)

21 goals
  Horst Hrubesch (Hamburger SV)
  Dieter Müller (1. FC Köln)

20 goals
  Manfred Burgsmüller (Borussia Dortmund)
  Harald Nickel (Borussia Mönchengladbach)

17 goals
  Reiner Geye (1. FC Kaiserslautern)

16 goals
  Klaus Allofs (Fortuna Düsseldorf)
  Dieter Hoeneß (FC Bayern Munich)

14 goals
  Hansi Müller (VfB Stuttgart)
  Friedhelm Funkel (Bayer Uerdingen)

Champion squad

References

External links
 DFB Bundesliga archive 1979/1980

Bundesliga seasons
1
Germany